I Wanna Be may refer to:

 "I Wanna Be", a 2007 song by Chris Brown from Exclusive
 "I Wanna Be", a 2017 song by Kehlani from SweetSexySavage

See also
 I Want to Be